The thoracic spinal nerve 6 (T6) is a spinal nerve of the thoracic segment.

It originates from the spinal column from below the thoracic vertebra 6 (T6).

References

Spinal nerves